The Shiant Islands (or  ) or Shiant Isles are a privately owned island group in the Minch, east of Harris in the Outer Hebrides of Scotland.

Etymology
The name Shiant is from the Scottish Gaelic , which means the "charmed", "holy" or "enchanted isles". The main islands are Garbh Eilean ("rough island") and Eilean an Taighe ("house island"), which are joined by a narrow isthmus, and Eilean Mhuire ("island of the Virgin Mary") to the east. Eilean an Taighe was called Eilean na Cille ("island of the church") prior to the 19th century.

A 17th-century chart by John Adair and several other 18th-century charts call Garbh Eilean Nunaltins Isle, Eilean Mhuire St Marys Isle and Eilean an Taighe St Columbs Isle. This last name suggests that the chapel on Eilean an Taighe might have been dedicated to St Columba. The meaning of Nunaltins remains unclear.

Geography and geology

The Shiant Islands lie east of the Sound of Shiant. In addition to these main islands, there is a line of Galtachan rocks that lie to the west: Galta Beag, Bodach, Stacan Laidir, Galta Mòr, Sgeir Mhic a' Ghobha and Damhag.

Geologically, these islands are an extension of the Trotternish peninsula of Skye. Their rocks are volcanic, and, at 60 million years old, very young compared with other Hebridean rocks. They are much higher in places than those at Staffa and the Giant's Causeway, but similar in that they were formed by the slow cooling of volcanic rocks deep underground. Intrusive sills exhibit a progression in their chemical compositions, from olivine-rich rocks at the base, to rocks with very little or no olivine at the top.

The sills are thought to have been formed by crystal settling. Recent study has suggested that at least one of the sills is an example of a multiple intrusion. In some places, the basalt is overlain by Jurassic mudstone, which weathers to form much more fertile soil than is present elsewhere in the Western Isles.

The islands can be visited by means of various cruise ships that operate from other Hebridean Islands and from mainland Scotland.

History

In 1549, Donald Monro, Dean of the Isles wrote in Scots of:
On the east side of this isle there is a bore, made like a vault, longer(?) than the arrow shot of any man on earth, through which gulping vault we used to row our sail boats, for fear of the horrible break of the seas that is on the outward side, but no large ship can sail through it." Nicolson (2002) calls this "vault" on Toll a' Roimh at the north east end of Garbh Eilean the "Hole of the Seals" and describes rowing a dinghy through it.Nicolson (2002) p. 217

A century and a half later, in 1703, Martin Martin wrote that
Island-More hath a chapel in it dedicated to the Virgin Mary, and is fruitful in corn and grass; the island joining to it on the west is only for pasturage.
At the beginning of the twentieth century, the Shiant Islands were home to only eight people. The author and politician Compton MacKenzie owned the islands from 1925 until 1937. He was an island lover who, at different points in his life, also occasionally rented Herm in the Channel Islands. He never lived on the Shiants, but paid several brief visits there during his time as owner.

In 1937, the islands were purchased by Nigel Nicolson, then an undergraduate at Oxford, using money that had been left to him by his grandmother. Nicolson later became a writer, publisher and politician, as MacKenzie had been. Nicolson's son, the writer Adam Nicolson, published the definitive book on the islands, Sea Room (2001). Today, the Shiants belong to Adam's son, Tom Nicolson. Sheep continue to graze the islands, as they have done since the mid-19th century. The simple bothy maintained by the Nicolson family on Eilean an Taighe is the only habitable structure on any of the islands. In 2012, Robert Macfarlane published a description of his visit to the islands, titled The Old Ways.

Wildlife

The Shiant Islands have a large population of seabirds, including tens of thousands of Atlantic puffins that breed in burrows on the slopes of Garbh Eilean, and significant numbers of common guillemots, razorbills, northern fulmars, black-legged kittiwakes, common shags, gulls and great skuas. (There are fewer puffins on Garbo Eilean than on the remote island of St Kilda, but they are much more densely congregated.)

Until recently, the islands were also home to a population of black rats, Rattus rattus, which are presumed to have originally come ashore from a shipwreck. Apart from one or two small islands in the Firth of Forth, the Shiants were the only place in the UK where the black rat (or ship rat) could still be found. There was thought to be a population of about 3,500 rats on the islands in wintertime, with their numbers rising exponentially during the summer. Analysis of their stomach contents had shown that they ate seabirds, but it could not be determined whether they preyed on live birds or simply scavenged dead ones. (Their numbers had for many years been well controlled in and around the house.)

During the winter of 2015–2016, Wildlife Management International Limited initiated a project to permanently eradicate rats from the Shiant Islands, as part of the Shiant Isles Seabird Recovery Project. The project was funded by contributions from the EU, the SNH, the RSPB and many individual donors. In March 2018, the Shiant Islands were deemed to have satisfactorily completed the internationally agreed two-year eradication period, and were officially declared rat-free.

See also

 List of islands of Scotland

References

Notes

Footnotes

General references
 
 
 Mac an Tàilleir, Iain (2003) Placenames/Ainmean-àite le buidheachas (pdf). Pàrlamaid na h-Alba. Retrieved 6 October 2009.
 Martin, Martin (1703) A Description of The Western Islands of Scotland (Circa 1695) . Appin Regiment/Appin Historical Society. Retrieved 3 March 2007
 
 Nicolson, Adam (2002) Sea Room. London. HarperCollins.

External links
 Site about the Shiant Isles

 
Islands of the Outer Hebrides
Sites of Special Scientific Interest in Western Isles North
Important Bird Areas of Scotland
Paleogene volcanism
Sills (geology)
Geology of Scotland
Archipelagoes of Scotland
Private islands of the United Kingdom